Ostwestfalen-Lippe (literally East(ern) Westphalia-Lippe, abbreviation OWL) is the eastern region of the German state of North Rhine-Westphalia, congruent with the administrative region of Detmold and containing the eastern part of Westphalia, joined with the Lippe region. The region has a population of about two million inhabitants. The major cities are Bielefeld, Paderborn, Gütersloh, Minden, Detmold, and Herford. The highest hill of Ostwestfalen-Lippe is the Totenkopf (498 m).

Some major globally operating companies are headquartered in the region, for example Bertelsmann, Miele, Dr. Oetker, Melitta, Gerry Weber, DMG Mori Aktiengesellschaft, Hörmann, Schüco, Wincor Nixdorf, Phoenix Contact, HEGLA and Claas. In 2012 OWL became Germans BMBF Leading Edge Technology Cluster for intelligent Technical Systems (it's OWL ), which is currently the largest public funded project in the context of the government initiative "Industry 4.0". Universities are located in Bielefeld, Paderborn and Lemgo. The Fraunhofer Society is engaged in OWL in Lemgo and Paderborn.

The Teutoburg Forest stretches across the region. It is the supposed site of the Battle of the Teutoburg Forest in the year 9 AD, where an alliance of Germanic tribes defeated a Roman army. In 1875, a statue was unveiled of the commander Arminius, who led the Germanics to victory at the battle. This statue, the Hermannsdenkmal, is one of the best-known sights in Ostwestfalen-Lippe.

References

External links 

 XING Ostwestfalen Lippe - official XING regional community

Geography of North Rhine-Westphalia
Regions of North Rhine-Westphalia
Westphalia